Obed Kofi Sam is a Ghanaian professional footballer who plays as a winger for Ghanaian Premier League side Karela United.

Career

Sekondi Hasaacas 
Sam previously played for Ghana Division One League side Sekondi Hasaacas before moving to Karela United. He spent one season with Hasaacas and during the 2019–20 Division One season he topped the club's assists log with 5 assists and won 3 man of the match awards in 10 matches.

Karela United 
Ahead of the 2020–21 Ghana Premier League season, in October 2020, Karela United officially announced that they had signed Sam from Sekondi Hasaacas following successful negotiations between the two clubs. He made his debut on 13 December 2020, playing the full 90 minutes in a 2–0 win against King Faisal Babies.

References

External links 

 

Living people
Association football wingers
Ghanaian footballers
Sekondi Hasaacas F.C. players
Ghana Premier League players
Karela United FC players
Year of birth missing (living people)